The Filbeck Building is a historic 1917 building in Denver, Colorado, designed by architect John J. Huddart. Located at 1527 Champa Street, it is next to the Roger & Son Mortuary/Yankee Dollar Building. It has been home to the Champa Bar, the Changing Scene Theater, and the Bovine Metropolis Theater.

References

Buildings and structures completed in 1917
Buildings and structures in Denver